Hymenosoma (crown crabs) is a genus of crabs, containing the following species:
Hymenosoma depressum Hombron & Jacquinot, 1846
Hymenosoma gaudichaudii Guérin, 1831
Hymenosoma geometricum Stimpson, 1858
Hymenosoma hodgkini Lucas, 1980
Hymenosoma longicrure Dawson & Griffiths, 2012
Hymenosoma orbiculare Desmarest, 1823
Hymenosoma projectum Dawson & Griffiths, 2012
Hymenosoma trilobatum Dawson & Griffiths, 2012

The majority of the species are found around southern Africa; the Australasian species H. hodgkini and H. geometricum may be better placed in other genera.

References

Majoidea